Anthony Michael Gordon (born 24 February 2001) is an English professional footballer who plays as a winger for  club Newcastle United and the England national under-21 team.

Early life
Gordon was born in Liverpool, Merseyside.

Club career

Everton
Gordon joined Everton as an 11-year-old following his release from Liverpool. On 6 December 2017, Gordon was named in Everton's first-team squad for the Europa League match away to Apollon Limassol. A day later, he made his first-team debut in the fixture, coming on as an 88th-minute substitute in a 3–0 win.

Gordon made his Premier League debut coming on as a substitute for Bernard in a 1–1 draw with West Ham United in January 2020. He received his first Premier League start in June 2020 in a 0–0 draw with Liverpool.

On 1 September 2020, Gordon signed a new five-year contract with Everton.

Preston North End (loan)
On 1 February 2021, Gordon joined Championship club Preston North End on loan for the remainder of the 2020–21 season. Five days later, he made his debut for Preston, being included in the starting line-up for a 2–1 home league defeat by Rotherham United.

Newcastle United
Gordon signed for Premier League club Newcastle United on 29 January 2023 on a long-term contract for a transfer fee reported by BBC Sport to be an initial £40 million, potentially rising to £45 million in add-ons. He made his debut on 4 February as a 69th-minute substitute in a 1–1 draw at home to West Ham United. On 10 March 2023 he said he had been disappointed by the curt manner that Everton announced his departure given that "I was a massive part in keeping the club up" the previous season.

International career
Having represented his country at U18 and U19 level, Gordon made his debut for the England under-20s during a 2–0 victory over Wales at St George's Park on 13 October 2020.

On 5 November 2021, Gordon received his first call up for the England under-21s and scored twice on his debut, a 3–1 victory over Czech Republic at Turf Moor in 2023 UEFA European Under-21 Championship qualification on 11 November 2021.

Career statistics

Honours
Individual
CEE Cup Player of the Tournament: 2017

References

External links

Profile at the Newcastle United F.C. website

2001 births
Living people
Footballers from Liverpool
English footballers
Association football wingers
Everton F.C. players
Preston North End F.C. players
Newcastle United F.C. players
Premier League players
English Football League players
England youth international footballers
England under-21 international footballers